Sudesh Dhaniram (born 14 January 1967) is a cricket player who formerly represented Guyana and most recently, the United States of America. He is a right-handed batsman and a right-arm off break bowler. He made his Twenty20 debut on 9 February 2010, for the United States in the 2010 ICC World Twenty20 Qualifier in the United Arab Emirates. His brother, Sunil also played for Guyana, and had a very successful career with Canada. He faced off against his brother in Canada vs USA matches a few times.

In February 2020, he was named in the West Indies' squad for the Over-50s Cricket World Cup in South Africa. However, the tournament was cancelled during the third round of matches due to the coronavirus pandemic.

References

External links

1967 births
Living people
Guyanese cricketers
American cricketers
Berbice cricketers
Guyana cricketers